Acalyptris repeteki is a moth of the family Nepticulidae. It was described by Puplesis in 1984. It is known from Turkmenistan and the United Arab Emirates.

The habitat consists of deserts.

The wingspan is 5.6 mm. Adults have been recorded in April and May.

References

Nepticulidae
Moths of Asia
Moths described in 1984